Lactamase, beta 2 is a protein that in humans is encoded by the LACTB2 gene.

Structure
LACTB2 is located on the 8th chromosome, with its specific location being 8q13.3. The gene contains 7 exons.

The LACTB2 protein has a metallo β-lactamase (MBL) fold, with two zinc ions in the active site.

Function 
The metallo beta-lactamases were first identified in bacteria; they give some strains antibiotic resistance by degrading beta-lactam antibiotics (such as penicillins). However, the protein family includes many members that are ribonucleases (RNases), deoxyribonucleases (DNases) and other metabolic enzymes  MBL ribonucleases are responsible for RNA processing, generating the 3' end of tRNA,(RNase Z) eukaryotic mRNA (CPSF-73) and  snRNA molecules  LACTB2 is a mitochondrial endoribonuclease which may have a role in degrading mitochondrial mRNAs.

Clinical significance
A tumor-specific LACTB2-NCOA2 fusion originating from intra-chromosomal rearrangement of chromosome 8 has been identified at both DNA and RNA levels. Unlike conventional oncogenic chimeric proteins, the fusion product lacks functional domain from respective genes, indicative of an amorphic rearrangement. This chimeric LACTB2-NCOA2 transcript was detected in 6 out of 99 (6.1%) colorectal cancer (CRC) cases, where NCOA2 was significantly downregulated. Enforced expression of wild-type NCOA2 but not the LACTB2-NCOA2 fusion protein impaired the pro-tumorigenic phenotypes of CRC cells, whereas knockdown of endogenous NCOA2 in normal colonocytes had opposite effects. Mechanistically, NCOA2 inhibited Wnt/β-catenin signaling through simultaneously upregulating inhibitors and downregulating stimulators of Wnt/β-catenin pathway. NCOA2 is a novel negative growth regulatory gene repressing the Wnt/β-catenin pathway in CRC, where recurrent fusion with LACTB2 contributes to its disruption.

References 

Genes
Human proteins